George Cadwalader (May 16, 1806 – February 3, 1879) was a general in the United States Army during the Mexican–American War and American Civil War.

Biography
Cadwalader was born and raised in Philadelphia. He studied law and was admitted to the bar. He served in the Pennsylvania state militia and suppressed anti-foreign riots in Philadelphia.

His father was Thomas Cadwalader, not to be confused with his cousin Thomas McCall Cadwalader (1795–1873), who was a general from New Jersey. His mother was Mary Biddle, who was the daughter of Clement Biddle, (1740–1818) who served in the American Revolutionary War.

He married Frances Butler Mease in 1830. They had one daughter, Frances, who died young.

Pennsylvania Militia
In 1824, Cadwalader formed a Pennsylvania State Militia artillery company known as the Philadelphia Grays and served as company captain.  In 1832, he was elected brigadier general of the First Brigade, First Division of the Pennsylvania State Militia.

While holding this position, he was criticized for his weak role in the Philadelphia anti-Catholic riots of 1844.  Cadwalader refused to allow the militia to take action as rioters destroyed the Irish-Catholic neighborhood on Kensington in May 1844.  When he did call out the militia five days after the violence began, his troops primarily stood as observers and did not actively try to suppress the riots.  Cadwalader argued that he could not do so without express order from the governor.  As a result, state law was changed several years later to permit emergency action without express approval from the governor.

In July of that same year, during three days of rioting in Southwark, a largely Catholic neighborhood in South Philadelphia, Cadwalader ordered his troops to fire into the crowd of nativists trying to destroy St. Philip Neri Church.  The street battle resulted in the deaths of twelve rioters and two militiamen, with many more injured.  These actions resulted in concern over the use of the military  against civilian populations and led directly to the creation of a much stronger and more professional police force in Philadelphia.

In 1845, Cadwalader was elected an honorary member of the Pennsylvania Society of the Cincinnati.

Mexican–American War
On March 3, 1847, Cadwalader was appointed brigadier general and took command of a brigade of reinforcements being sent to Winfield Scott in central Mexico. His unit was designated the 2nd Brigade in the newly formed 3rd Division under Gideon Pillow. He participated in the battles of Contreras, Churubusco, and Chapultepec. For his services at Chapultepec, he was brevetted major general in the Regular Army, to rank from September 13, 1847.

Cadwalader was an original member of the Aztec Club of 1847 and was honorably discharged from the Army on July 20, 1848.

Civil War

When the Civil War broke out, Cadwalader immediately volunteered his services to the Union cause. Due to his distinguished military experience, he was appointed major general of Pennsylvania Volunteers by Governor Andrew Curtin in April 1861.

On May 15, he was appointed military commander in Maryland, where Union communications were being threatened by local Confederate sympathizers. On May 25, federal troops arrested a Maryland planter, John Merryman, who had been recruiting soldiers for the Confederate army and imprisoned him at Fort McHenry, where General Cadwalader had his headquarters. When Chief Justice Taney issued a writ of habeas corpus for Merryman, Cadwalader ignored him, stating that he was authorized by the President to suspend habeas corpus. This dispute resulted in the important case of Ex parte Merryman.

Cadwalader later took command of the 1st Division in Robert Patterson's Army of the Shenandoah. On May 25, 1862, he was commissioned major general in the United States Volunteers. Cadwalader later commanded the post at Corinth, Mississippi. He returned to Pennsylvania and commanded the post at Philadelphia and successively the District of Philadelphia, the District of the Brandywine, and the District of the Susquehanna before resigning in July 1865. He spent the remainder of his life in Philadelphia.

In April 1865, General Cadwalader helped found the Military Order of the Loyal Legion of the United States (MOLLUS), a quasi-fraternal organization for former Union Army and Navy officers. He was a member of the Pennsylvania commandery and received MOLLUS insignia number 60. He served as Commander-in-Chief of the Loyal Legion from its founding until his death.

Cadwalader died in Philadelphia on February 3, 1879.

Family tree

See also

 List of American Civil War generals (Union)

References

 Eicher, John H., and Eicher, David J., Civil War High Commands, Stanford University Press, 2001, .
 Bauer, K. Jack, The Mexican–American War, 1846–1848, Bison Books, 1992

External links
 Portrait of General George Cadwalader  by Thomas Eakins
 

1806 births
1879 deaths
American military personnel of the Mexican–American War
Members of the Aztec Club of 1847
Union Army generals
Military personnel from Philadelphia
People of Pennsylvania in the American Civil War
Members of the Philadelphia Club
Burials at Christ Church, Philadelphia